South Bank 3 ferry wharf is located on the southern side of the Brisbane River serving the Brisbane suburb of South Brisbane in Queensland, Australia. It is used by RiverCity Ferries' CityHopper service. South Bank wharves 1 & 2 are located 500 metres upstream.

History 
The wharf sustained moderate damage during the January 2011 Brisbane floods. It reopened after repairs on 14 February 2011.

References

External links

Ferry wharves in Brisbane
South Brisbane, Queensland